Yurt Gazetesi is a national daily newspaper and website published in Turkey. It started broadcasting on January 29, 2012. The paper is owned by former Republican People's Party politician . The editor-in-chief of the newspaper is Bilal Başer and its Istanbul representative is Abdullah Ağırkan.

Awards
  Human Rights Democracy Peace and Solidarity Award (2014)

References

Newspapers published in Istanbul
Turkish-language newspapers
Publications established in 2012
2012 establishments in Turkey
Daily newspapers published in Turkey